The 1995 Ameritech Cup was a women's tennis tournament played on indoor carpet courts at the UIC Pavilion in Chicago, Illinois in the United States that was part of Tier II of the 1995 WTA Tour. It was the 24th edition of the tournament and was held from February 6 through February 12, 1995. Third-seeded Magdalena Maleeva won the singles title and earned $79,000 first-prize money.

Finals

Singles

 Magdalena Maleeva defeated  Lisa Raymond 7–5, 7–6
 It was Maleeva's 1st title of the year and the 4th of her career.

Doubles

 Gabriela Sabatini /  Brenda Schultz defeated  Marianne Werdel /  Tami Whitlinger-Jones 5–7, 7–6, 6–4
 It was Sabatini's 2nd title of the year and the 38th of her career. It was Schultz's 1st title of the year and the 6th of her career.

External links
 Women's Tennis Association (WTA) tournament details
 International Tennis Federation (ITF) tournament edition details

Ameritech Cup
Ameritech Cup
1995 in sports in Illinois
February 1995 sports events in the United States
1995 in American tennis